Maseru United is a Lesotho football club based in Maseru. It is based in the city of Maseru in the Maseru District.

The team currently plays in Lesotho Second Division.

In 1970 the team won the Lesotho Premier League.

Stadium
Currently the team plays at the 1000 capacity Ratjomose Stadium.

Honours
Lesotho Premier League: 1970, 1976, 1981

Performance in CAF competitions
1971 African Cup of Champions Clubs: 2 appearances
1977 African Cup of Champions Clubs

References

External links
http://www.calciopedia.org/statistiche/africa/487-statistiche-lesotho

Football clubs in Lesotho